Limonia is a genus of crane flies in the family Limoniidae. There are at least 430 described species in Limonia. It is somewhat of a 'catch-all' genus, where some members should rightly be placed elsewhere.

See also
 List of Limonia species

References

External links

 
 

Limoniidae
Tipulomorpha genera